John Wesley McGrath (January 12, 1842 – December 9, 1905) was an American jurist.

Born in Philadelphia, Pennsylvania, McGrath taught school, worked for the provost marshal, and the commercial oil business in Pennsylvania. McGrath went to Albion College. In 1868, McGrath completed his law study at University of Michigan Law School and practiced law in Ann Arbor, Michigan. McGrath was a Republican and served on the Detroit Board of Education. He was also the city counselor of the city of Detroit. McGrath also served as the first commissioner of the Michigan Labor Bureau. McGrath served on the Michigan Supreme Court, as a Democrat from 1891 to 1895 and was the chief justice. McGrath died at his home in Detroit, Michigan.

Notes

1842 births
1905 deaths
Politicians from Philadelphia
Politicians from Detroit
Albion College alumni
University of Michigan Law School alumni
Educators from Michigan
Michigan lawyers
Michigan Democrats
Michigan Republicans
Members of the Detroit Board of Education
Chief Justices of the Michigan Supreme Court
19th-century American lawyers
Educators from Pennsylvania
19th-century American judges
19th-century American educators
Justices of the Michigan Supreme Court